Francis is a former provincial electoral division for the Legislative Assembly of the province of Saskatchewan, Canada, centred on the town of Francis, Saskatchewan. This district was created before the 2nd Saskatchewan general election in 1908. The riding was dissolved and combined with the Milestone and Qu'Appelle-Wolseley districts before the 9th Saskatchewan general election in 1938. It is now part of the constituency of Indian Head-Milestone.

Members of the Legislative Assembly

Election results

|-

|Provincial Rights
|John Wesley Mahan
|align="right"|877
|align="right"|47.33%
|align="right"|–
|- bgcolor="white"
!align="left" colspan=3|Total
!align="right"|1,853
!align="right"|100.00%
!align="right"|

|-

|Conservative
|John Wesley Mahan
|align="right"|700
|align="right"|39.17%
|align="right"|-8.16
|- bgcolor="white"
!align="left" colspan=3|Total
!align="right"|1,787
!align="right"|100.00%
!align="right"|

|-

|Conservative
|Franklin William James
|align="right"|1,228
|align="right"|39.79%
|align="right"|+0.62
|- bgcolor="white"
!align="left" colspan=3|Total
!align="right"|3,086
!align="right"|100.00%
!align="right"|

|-

|Independent
|Samuel Norval Horner
|align="right"|1,228
|align="right"|45.75%
|align="right"|–
|- bgcolor="white"
!align="left" colspan=3|Total
!align="right"|2,684
!align="right"|100.00%
!align="right"|

|-

|- bgcolor="white"
!align="left" colspan=3|Total
!align="right"|3,036
!align="right"|100.00%
!align="right"|

|-

|- bgcolor="white"
!align="left" colspan=3|Total
!align="right"|4,277
!align="right"|100.00%
!align="right"|

|-

|Conservative
|Samuel Norval Horner
|align="right"|1,896
|align="right"|34.57%
|align="right"|-23.53

|Farmer-Labour
|Robert Ernest Juby
|align="right"|1,085
|align="right"|19.78%
|align="right"|-
|- bgcolor="white"
!align="left" colspan=3|Total
!align="right"|5,485
!align="right"|100.00%
!align="right"|

See also
Electoral district (Canada)
List of Saskatchewan provincial electoral districts
List of Saskatchewan general elections
List of political parties in Saskatchewan
Francis, Saskatchewan

References
 Saskatchewan Archives Board – Saskatchewan Election Results By Electoral Division

Former provincial electoral districts of Saskatchewan